Forest River may refer to:

 Forest River (company), a transportation company in Indiana, United States
 Forest River (North Dakota), a river in North Dakota, United States
 Forest River, North Dakota, a town

See also
 Forrest River, a river in the Kimberley of Western Australia
 
 River Forest (disambiguation)